Sorocaba is a monotypic moth genus of the family Phiditiidae. Its only species, Sorocaba anomala, is found in São Paulo, Brazil. Both the species and genus were described by Frederic Moore in 1882.

Taxonomy
The genus was established in the Sphingidae and later placed in the Lymantriidae by Schaus in 1927. It was transferred from to the Apatelodidae by Minet in 1986 and finally to the subfamily Phiditiinae by Lemaire and Minet. The subfamily was raised to family level in 2011.

References

Bombycoidea
Macrolepidoptera genera
Monotypic moth genera